TEXRail is a hybrid rail (light rail with some features similar to commuter rail) line in Tarrant County, Texas, United States that provides service between downtown Fort Worth and Dallas/Fort Worth International Airport via Grapevine and other Tarrant County communities. It is operated by Trinity Metro (formerly Fort Worth Transportation Authority) and started service on January 10, 2019, with a preview service having occurred on December 31, 2018.

The new line is worth $1 billion. This segment of the Cotton Belt Rail Line is operated independent of the other segments, as it was built by Trinity Metro, instead of DART, who will be building the Silver Line to the east.

Officials with Trinity Metro are hoping the new rail line will entice non-member cities along the line to join the transit agency in its quest to become a regional transit entity. Cities along the route include Colleyville, Haltom City and North Richland Hills. The route also goes through small parts of Hurst and Southlake. Unlike Grapevine, those cities do not have room under the state-mandated 8.25% sales tax cap for the ¢ needed to join. Trinity Metro will not build a station along the line in those cities unless they become a member city first.

History 
Grapevine citizens voted 8,058 to 2,898 on November 7, 2006 to levy a 1-cent sales tax, of which ¢ would authorize Grapevine to contract with Trinity Metro for rail service and another ¢ for other transit improvements, like a downtown parking garage. This includes an expansion of the commuter rail system to link southwest Fort Worth to the north end of DFW International Airport.

Trinity Metro's Board of Directors finalized their plans in October 2006 for the southwest-to-northeast expansion. Two commuter routes, a light rail route and a bus rapid transit route were under consideration. The Board's recommendation was a commuter rail line that runs in the southwest part of the city near Sycamore School Road, running near Texas Christian University and the Medical District on its way to the existing T&P Station and Fort Worth Central station. At that point it turns northwest toward the Stockyards before turning northeast toward DFW International Airport. Preliminary plans call for nine new stations with eleven total, and could be contingent on other cities along the corridor joining the agency.

A proposal to use private funding to construct both TEXRail and DART's Dallas County segment was considered, but this plan was abandoned after necessary legislation was not passed in the State Legislature. Following this legislative defeat, Trinity Metro began pursuing federal grant funds in order to build TEXRail.  On March 5, 2014, it was announced that the TEXRail project would receive $50 million in federal grant funds from President Barack Obama's 2015 New Starts Funding Budget.

In April 2015, Trinity Metro approved a contract for pre-construction services, awarded to an Archer Western Contractors/Herzog Contracting Corp (Archer Western Herzog) a joint venture, as well as approving the final design for the Iron Horse and Smithfield Road stations.

On June 9, 2015, Trinity Metro ordered an initial eight 4-car articulated Stadler FLIRTs DMUs. The contract was valued at $106.7 million, with an option for up to 24 additional DMUs, and includes the supply of components for 10 years. This was Switzerland-based Stadler's first order in the US for any model outside its Stadler GTW product line, therefore making it subject to the regulations of the Buy America Act. As such, one element of the contract is that the final assembly of the trains will take place in the US, at their plant in Salt Lake City.

That same month, the Federal Transit Administration (FTA) gave approval for the project to advance into the engineering phase that immediately precedes the start of construction. In June 2016, Trinity Metro received a Letter of No Prejudice from the FTA, essentially green-lighting the project. In reaction to this, Trinity Metro said they planned to start preliminary construction in July 2016, on track for a planned opening date in December 2018. DFW Airport also said they would provide the $40 million to build the station at Terminal B, with an opening date in late 2018.

Construction on the line officially started on August 24, 2016, with a groundbreaking held at Grapevine's historic depot, the site of Grapevine-Main Street station.

On January 4, 2019, less than 12 hours before service was scheduled to commence, the opening was suspended due to signal issues identified during an inspection by Federal Railroad Administration officials along the southern end of the line in Downtown Fort Worth. The new opening took place on January 10, 2019.

Future expansion 
Scott Mahaffey, Trinity Metro board chairman, has expressed interest in extending the line south and adding two stations to serve the medical district and Texas Christian University at an estimated additional cost of $200 million. This extension could be completed by 2025, when all additional planned and proposed stations are added the line will be an additional 14 miles longer. City Councilman Jungus Jordan has said that he would like to see the line go even farther south to serve Tarleton State University's new campus near the Chisholm Trail Parkway. In 2020, $38.9 million was granted by the U.S. Department of Transportation-Federal Transit Administration to extend the line to the medical district. Under the proposed expansion plan, construction would start in spring 2023 with completion by the fall of 2025.

Operations 
Travel time from T&P Station to DFW International Airport is estimated to be approximately 55 minutes. There are 73 trips per day, with 30 minute headways between start of service at 3:20am to 9:00am for morning rush, 2:30pm to 7:00pm for afternoon rush, with 1-hour headways outside of the rush hour time periods; all 100 series trains listed on the Trinity Metro TEXRail schedule do not complete full journeys from FTW to DFW or vice versa.

The line is predominantly single tracked, with passing sidings installed to allow for 30-minute headways.

Stations 

Stations were opened on December 31, 2018:

Rolling stock 

Trinity Metro provides TEXRail service using eight Stadler FLIRT self-propelled diesel multiple units (DMU) capable of seating 229 passengers and carrying up to 488 passengers.

The contract to purchase eight trainsets, valued at about $100 million, was awarded to Stadler in June 2015.  The first set was delivered in October 2017, and four more sets had arrived by November 2018. Equipment testing and crew training started in March 2018.

Each rail vehicle is configured with an operator cab at either end for bidirectional movement. At the center of the train is the power pack with two diesel engines, with a passageway to allow access to other parts of the train, and allows it to be much quieter than traditional commuter rail. TEXRail vehicle amenities include USB ports equipped at every seat, work tables, lap trays, a quiet car, ADA compliant level boarding, overhead luggage racks, bike racks, and a restroom near the center of each train.

References

External links 
 

Passenger rail transportation in Texas
Transportation in the Dallas–Fort Worth metroplex
Railway lines opened in 2019
Commuter rail in the United States
2019 establishments in Texas
Transportation in Fort Worth, Texas